C111 may refer to

 Acer TravelMate C111, an Acer TravelMate model
 Discrimination (Employment and Occupation) Convention, 1958
 Mercedes-Benz C111
 Roche's cobas c111, a compact clinical chemistry laboratory analyzer